Ghada Ayadi (born 10 August 1992) is a Tunisian footballer who plays as a forward, an attacking midfielder and a right back for Al Nassr and the Tunisia national team.

Club career
Ayadi played for SAS in Lebanon in 2017, and for Amman in Jordan.

International career
Ayadi has capped for Tunisia at senior level, including two friendly away wins over Jordan in June 2021.

International goals
Scores and results list Tunisia's goal tally first

See also
List of Tunisia women's international footballers

References

External links
 

1992 births
Living people
Tunisian women's footballers
Women's association football forwards
Women's association football midfielders
Women's association football fullbacks
Stars Association for Sports players
Lebanese Women's Football League players
Tunisia women's international footballers
Tunisian expatriate women's footballers
Tunisian expatriate sportspeople in Lebanon
Tunisian expatriate sportspeople in Jordan
Expatriate women's footballers in Lebanon
Expatriate women's footballers in Jordan
Saudi Women's Premier League players